Zuni is an unincorporated community in Isle of Wight County in the Hampton Roads region of southeastern Virginia in the United States.

Zuni is home to a general store, a gas station, a small engine repair shop and two churches and is served by its own Post Office. Articles written about Zuni on the internet say that Zuni was also home to hotels, a bank and other businesses in the mid-20th century. Though technically within the nearby town of Ivor, Zuni is the closest community to Virginia's only naturist facility, known as White Tail Resort.

Zuni sits on the banks of the Blackwater River, which separates Isle of Wight County with Southampton County.  In 1999 Zuni was flooded by Hurricane Floyd and flooded again in 2006, causing the river to overflow and completely cover the bridge crossing the river. When the river overflows it floods many homes in the Zuni area.

Zuni is on U.S. Route 460, southeast of Ivor and northwest of Windsor.

Zuni, Virginia appears as a location in the dystopian novel Asphalt by Carl Hancock Rux.

References 

Unincorporated communities in Virginia
Unincorporated communities in Isle of Wight County, Virginia